Edmund Collins was an Australian Roman Catholic bishop.

Edmund Collins may also refer to:

Edmund Collins, screenwriter and actor, see Walls of Glass
Edmund Collins, a character in the film Eulogy

See also
Ed Collins (disambiguation)
Eddie Collins (disambiguation)